Painkulam (Malayalam: പൈങ്കുളം) is a village in Panjal Grama Panchayat in Thrissur district in the state of Kerala, India. The village, situated on the shores of Bharathappuzha, is the birthplace of Late Raman Chakyar, who was a leader with a vision and a mission to the world of art. He taught the temple arts Koodiyattam and Chakyar Koothu to non Chakyar castes and democratized the art form.

Painkulam village has a government upper primary school, several preschool nurseries and a local library (Grameena Vayanasala).

An aqueduct, built in 1960s by the irrigation department, is a major attraction in the village.

Vazhalikkavu Temple is situated in Painkulam, this evergreen location (One side forest area, one side Bharathapuzha, and vayal) provide a good situation to pilgrims. The festival is basically the birthday of Devi and this is the event which is celebrated by all the localities irrespective of caste and race. When the elephants are decorated with 'Caparison', it will become a charm of the festival. The 'Panchavadhyam' and fireworks is really fabulous. A very old "Kootharangu" is also located near to the temple.

The limits of the village are Thozhuppadam, Killimangalam, Panjal and Cheruthuruthy villages.

Annual fest of Vazhalikkavu temple during February-March of every year is a major event in Painkulam.ayyourmadamn pakannar temple

Demographics
 India census, Painkulam had a population of 8688 with 4088 males and 4600 females.

References

Villages in Thrissur district

pakannar temple on painkulam ayyourmadam